Youngs Creek may refer to:

Youngs Creek, Indiana, an unincorporated community
Youngs Creek (Johnson County, Indiana), a stream
Youngs Creek (Orange County, Indiana), a stream
Youngs Creek (Long Branch tributary), a stream in Missouri
Youngs Creek (Stinson Creek tributary), a stream in Missouri
Youngs Creek (Lake Erie), a watershed administered by the Long Point Region Conservation Authority, that drains into Lake Erie

See also
Young Creek